The St. Mary's (Ohio) football program from 1910 to 1919 represented St. Mary's College (later renamed the University of Dayton) in its second decade of intercollegiate football.  The team during those years was led by four head coaches: Orville Smith was the head coach in 1910 and compiled a 5–1 record; Roland Bevan was the head coach in 1911 and 1912, compiling a 7–5–1 record; Louis Clark was the head coach in 1913, 1917, and 1918 and compiled a 12–4–1 record; Alfred McCray was the head coach from 1914 to 1916 and compiled a 9–7 record; and Harry Solimano was the coach in 1919 and compiled a 2–2 record.

1910

The 1910 St. Mary's (Ohio) football team represented St. Mary's College as an independent during the 1910 college football season. In its first season under head coach Orville Smith, the team compiled a 5–1 record.

Schedule

1911

The 1911 St. Mary's (Ohio) football teamrepresented St. Mary's College as an independent during the 1911 college football season. In its first season under head coach Roland Bevan, the team compiled a 3–3–1 record.

Schedule

1912

The 1912 St. Mary's (Ohio) football team represented St. Mary's College as an independent during the 1912 college football season. In its second and final season under head coach Roland Bevan, the team compiled a 4–2 record.

Schedule

1913

The 1913 St. Mary's (Ohio) football team represented St. Mary's College as an independent during the 1913 college football season. In its first season under head coach Louis Clark, the team compiled a 4–1–1 record.

Schedule

1914

The 1914 Dayton Flyers football team represented St. Mary's College as an independent during the 1914 college football season. In its first season under head coach Alfred McCray, the team compiled a 2–2 record.

Schedule

1915

The 1915 St. Mary's (Ohio) football team represented St. Mary's College as an independent during the 1915 college football season. In its second season under head coach Alfred McCray, the team compiled a 3–2 record.

Schedule

1916

The 1916 St. Mary's (Ohio) football team represented St. Mary's College as an independent during the 1916 college football season. In its third and final season under head coach Alfred McCray, the team compiled a 4–3 record.

Schedule

1917

The 1917 St. Mary's (Ohio) football team represented St. Mary's College as an independent during the 1917 college football season. In its second season under head coach Louis Clark, the team compiled a 7–2 record.

Schedule

1918

The 1918 St. Mary's (Ohio) football team represented St. Mary's College as an independent during the 1918 college football season. In its third and final season under head coach Louis Clark, the team compiled a 1–1 record.

Schedule

1919

The 1919 St. Mary's (Ohio) football team represented St. Mary's College as an independent during the 1919 college football season. In its first and only season under head coach Harry Solimano, the team compiled a 2–2 record.

Schedule

References

1910
St. Mary's
St. Mary's
St. Mary's
St. Mary's
St. Mary's
St. Mary's
St. Mary's
St. Mary's
St. Mary's
St. Mary's